Bemidji High School is a public high school in Bemidji, Minnesota, United States. The school is situated on a  campus two miles (3 km) west of downtown Bemidji. The Mississippi River runs behind the high school.  Constructed in 2000, Bemidji High School is the largest in northern Minnesota in terms of student enrollment.

The high school received fame when it was featured on Larry the Cable Guy's new show, Only in America with Larry the Cable Guy. The show emphasized the fact that BHS is the only high school in the world to offer a curling class.

BHS was named a Silver Medal School by the US News and ranked 29th out of 786 Minnesota high schools.

Construction
Prompted by aging facilities and an increasing student population, the district hired an architect to examine the district’s facility needs and develop solutions. The educational spaces are arranged in academic clusters, each featuring general-purpose classrooms, labs, spaces, a special project center and teacher planning centers. The project was officially completed in April 2001.

Athletics
Bemidji High School's mascot is the Lumberjack. The school offers boys' and girls' soccer, swimming, basketball, Nordic skiing, hockey, golf, tennis, baseball, softball, dance line, cross country, curling, cheerleading, wrestling, football, gymnastics, and track & field.

School Day
Bemidji High School operates on a block type schedule. On Monday, Tuesday, Thursday and Friday students have only four classes that are 90 minutes long. Every other Wednesday, there is a homeroom class (between 9:44 and 10:34) that provides students with an opportunity to build relationships with a specific teacher. With this type of schedule, students are able to take more classes throughout the year.

Academics
Bemidji High School offers over 200 different class options. BHS encompasses several Advanced Placement courses as well as Project Lead the Way courses into the school.

Activities
Bemidji High School offers a variety of different activities:

 Art Club
 Environmental Club
 FIRST Robotics Competition Team
 GSA (Gay-Straight Alliance)
 Interact Club
 JROTC
 Knowledge Bowl
 Link Crew
 Math league
 Mock Trial
 Model UN
 National Honor Society
 Outdoor Adventure Club
 Science Olympiad
 Speech Team
 Student Congress
 Student Council
 Yearbook

Arts
Bemidji High School is home to two show choir organizations, La Voce Ballo (Women's, grades 9-12) and, Vocalmotive (mixed, grades 9-12).

Notable alumni
Bronko Nagurski (1926), Hall of Fame NFL player
Mike Falls (1952), former NFL player
Gary Burger (1960), lead singer of The Monks
Gary Sargent (1972), former NHL player
Bill Israelson (1975), former PGA Tour golfer
Bryan Hickerson (c. 1982), former MLB pitcher
George Pelawa (1986), 1986 Minnesota Mr. Hockey
Joe Motzko (1998), former NHL player
Frank Mays (c. 2009), indoor professional football player
Ber (musician), Indie pop musician

References

Public high schools in Minnesota
Schools in Beltrami County, Minnesota